Kangping County is a county of Liaoning Province, Northeast China, it is under the administration of the prefecture-level city of Shenyang, the capital of Liaoning, bordering Inner Mongolia to the northwest, and is  north of downtown Shenyang. It lies just off of G25 Changchun–Shenzhen Expressway, and is the northernmost county-level division of Shenyang City, bordering It borders Faku County to the south as well as the prefecture-level cities of Tieling to the east, Fuxin to the west, and Tongliao (Inner Mongolia) to the north.

Administrative divisions
The county includes seven towns, four townships, and four ethnic townships.

Climate

References

External links

County-level divisions of Liaoning